Superagnia fuchsi is a species of beetle in the family Cerambycidae, and the only species in the genus Superagnia. It was described by Stephan von Breuning in 1968.

References

Lamiini
Beetles described in 1968